Pasiflora is the fourth full-length studio album by American rock band Constants. The album was released on July 24, 2012 through The Mylene Sheath in CD and digital download formats. A limited edition vinyl pressing of the album will be made available on August 21, 2012 through The Mylene Sheath as well. The album was recorded at Radar Studios using solar energy.

History
On March 1, 2012 the album's opening track "Sunrise" was made available for streaming on MTV Hive.

On May 30, 2012 the album's release date, cover art, and track listing were revealed.

On July 19, 2012 an official music video for the album track "Passenger" premiered on Alternative Press.

On July 24, 2012 the album was released in CD and digital download formats. The entire album was also made available for streaming on the band's Bandcamp profile.

Track listing

Personnel
Will Benoit - vocals, guitar, production, mixing
Orion Wainer - bass
Rob Motes - drums
Daryl Rabidoux - co-mixing
Michael Repasch-Nieves/ Radar Visual - artwork design

References

External links
Official website

2012 albums
Constants (band) albums